Color Decay is the eighth studio album by American metalcore band The Devil Wears Prada. It was released on September 16, 2022, through Solid State Records. The album was produced by Jonathan Gering.

Background and promotion
On September 29, 2021, The Devil Wears Prada released the first single "Sacrifice" along with an accompanying music video. On February 3, 2022, the band unveiled the second single "Watchtower" and its corresponding music video. On June 7, the third single "Salt" was released. At the same time, they announced the album itself, the album cover, the track list, and release date. On July 26, the band released the fourth single "Time" along with a music video. On September 13, three days before the album release, the band published the fifth and final single "Broken".

Critical reception

Color Decay received generally positive reviews from critics. AllMusic gave the album a positive review saying that "the band firing on all cylinders with a meaty, 12-song set that pairs unrelenting aggression with expansive arrangements and introspective lyrics." Distorted Sound scored the album 8 out of 10 and said: "Ultimately then, even if Color Decay did feel like a bit of a sure thing given the band's recent form, the delivery here is exquisite. This is everything one could ask of a modern metalcore record; hugely melodic and memorable and yet often just as searingly heavy, with all this elevated by an intense emotional resonance, it's yet another home run from a band who have kept in step with the evolution and growth of the genre in a manner that many others could only dream of." John Bacon of HM stated "An emotional work of art, Color Decay is a record for both diehard fans and those who are new to this scene." Louder Sound gave the album a positive review and stated: "After years of solid and consistent evolution, The Devil Wears Prada have nailed a sound that ticks all the boxes: thought-provoking, anthemic and belligerent, Color Decay might just be their finest hour."

New Noise gave the album 4 out of 5 and stated: "While not their best release, they certainly put their best foot forward on Color Decay, delivering many songs that fans expect, and some that they may not. I can't blame a band for trying new ideas and concepts, and The Devil Wears Prada incorporate them in a way that may not work out, but they certainly don't fail with experimenting. This album is heavy and explodes with emotion. It is certainly worth the 40-plus minutes you'll spend listening to it." Rock 'N' Load praised the album saying, "Color Decay is an incredibly strong album from a band that has reached the point in their career where they can have complete control of their sound. They’ve grown and matured as both musicians and people since their 2006 debut album, and this release is the encapsulation of all that grew into an incredible release filled with crushing instrumentals, great vocals and hope. Give it a spin!" Wall of Sound gave the album a score 6.5/10 and saying: "This album definitely showcases the band's diversity and musicianship. Color Decay can be massively heavy at times, super rock-y at others, and also very slow and melancholic. I think it's going to be divisive amongst fans, with the OGs liking the heavy tracks, and newer fans liking the more rock and melancholic flavoured tracks. Personally, as a fan of heavier music it makes me a little sad that a band that can write such unique and top-tier metal tracks (ala the recent ZII and half the tracks on this album) then writes half an album of mellow rock songs. If it were up to me, they would start a side project for the rock and melancholic tracks and stick to the heavy stuff for The Devil Wears Prada, or switch to EPs and really focusing in on one sound for each."

Track listing

Personnel
Credits adapted from AllMusic.

The Devil Wears Prada
 Mike Hranica – lead vocals, additional guitars
 Kyle Sipress – lead guitar, backing vocals
 Jeremy DePoyster – rhythm guitar, vocals
 Mason Nagy – bass
 Giuseppe Capolupo – drums
 Jonathan Gering – keyboards, synthesizers, programming, backing vocals, production

Additional musicians
 Matt Mantooth and Terrence Vitali – backing vocals, engineering assistant
 Juan Pardo – backing vocals

Additional personnel
 Sam Guaiana – additional production
 Alex Prieto – engineering
 Brendan Collins and Sam Madill – engineering assistant
 Anthony Salazar – drum technician
 Mike Kalajian – mastering
 Paul Koehler – management
 Matt Andersen and Dave Shapiro – booking
 Adam Skatula – A&R
 Harry Vincent – cover art
 Jim Hughes – layout
 Anthony Barlich – photography

References

2022 albums
The Devil Wears Prada (band) albums